Robb Glacier is a glacier about 40 nautical miles (70 km) long, flowing from Clarkson Peak north along the east side of Softbed Ridges to the Ross Ice Shelf at Cape Goldie. Named by the expedition after Murray Robb, leader of the New Zealand Geological Survey Antarctic Expedition (NZGSAE) (1959–60), who traversed this glacier to reach Lowery Glacier.

See also
Cape Huinga
Whakawhiti Saddle
Worthley Peak

References

Glaciers of the Ross Dependency
Shackleton Coast